The Roman Catholic Archdiocese of Rimouski is a Roman Catholic archdiocese that includes part of the Province of Quebec, Canada, and includes the suffragan dioceses of Baie-Comeau and Gaspé.

As of 2018, the archdiocese contains 97 parishes, 74 active diocesan priests, 5 religious priests, and 148,320 Catholics.  It also has 453 Women Religious, 23 Religious Brothers, and 14 permanent deacons.

Bishops

Diocesan bishops
The following is a list of the bishops and archbishops of Rimouski and their terms of service:
Jean-Pierre-François Laforce-Langevin (1867–1891)
André-Albert Blais (1891–1919)
Joseph-Romuald Léonard (1919–1926)
Georges-Alexandre Courchesne (1928–1950)
Charles Eugène Parent (1951–1967)
Louis Lévesque (1967–1973)
Joseph Gilles Napoléon Ouellet (1973–1992)
Bertrand Blanchet (1992–2008)
Pierre-André Fournier (2008–2015)
Denis Grondin (2015–present)

Coadjutor bishops
 André-Albert Blais (1889-1891)
 Louis Lévesque (1964-1967)

Auxiliary bishop
 Charles Eugène Parent (1944-1951), appointed Archbishop here

Other priests of this diocese who became bishops
 Gérard Couturier, appointed Bishop of Golfe St-Laurent, Québec in 1956
 Raymond Dumais, appointed Bishop of Gaspé, Québec in 1993

References

Archdiocese of Rimouski page at catholichierarchy.org  retrieved July 13, 2006

External links

Official Site

 
Catholic Church in Quebec
Organizations based in Quebec
Rimouski